Truex is a surname of Walloon Huguenot origin, found primarily in the United States and Canada. The majority of people with this surname (as well as Truax and other variants) are descended from Philippe Du Trieux, who arrived in New Amsterdam (modern New York) in 1624. People with this surname include:

Adrienne Truex (1907–1947), American actress better known as Adrienne Ames
Ernest Truex
Max Truex
Martin Truex Sr.
Martin Truex Jr.
Ryan Truex (born 1992), American racing driver and brother of Martin Truex Jr.
Van Day Truex
William Truex

See also
TrueX

References